John Wesley Burgess (19 May 1907 – 1 September 1990) was a Liberal party member of the House of Commons of Canada. He was born in Wallaceburg, Ontario and became a lawyer by career.

He was first elected at the Lambton—Kent riding in the 1962 general election. After serving his only term, the 25th Parliament, he was defeated in the 1963 federal election by Mac McCutcheon of the Progressive Conservative party.

External links
 

1907 births
1990 deaths
Members of the House of Commons of Canada from Ontario
Liberal Party of Canada MPs
Lawyers in Ontario
People from Chatham-Kent
20th-century Canadian lawyers